Lake Riverside is a census-designated place in the south western part of Riverside County, California. The 2010 United States census reported Lake Riverside's population was 1,173. The community is named after the man-made Lake that the community surrounds.

Geography and Geology
According to the United States Census Bureau, the census-designated place (CDP) covers an area of 7.3 square miles (18.8 km), 98.85% of it land, and 1.15% of it water.

The water part of the CDP, Lake Riverside, was artificially made when a private farming-ranching company owning the land needed a water reservoir for its operation. With the approval of the Army Corps of Engineers, a well was dug in 1962 to pipe water from underground springs to create the Lake in the low lying areas of the Cahuilla Creek watershed and to sustain it. The original well from 1962 lasted to 1994, and a new well was dug in 1995 to sustain the Lake.

From early 2016 to late 2019, a swarm of small earthquakes occurred -- ranging in magnitude from 0.7 to 4.4 -- the strongest one occurred in August 2018, south of Lake Riverside, just off Cahuilla Road (SR 371). The remaining more than 22,000 individual seismic events occurred near the western edge of the Cahuilla Reservation stretching  northward to just east of the Lake and never generated any significant damage in four years.

Demographics

At the 2010 census Lake Riverside had a population of 1,173. The racial makeup of Lake Riverside was: 1,042 (88.8%) White; 21 (1.8%) African American; 16 (1.4%) Native American; 2 (0.2%) Asian; 8 (0.7%) Pacific Islander; 46 (3.9%) from other races; and 38 (3.2%) from two or more races. Hispanic or Latino of any race were 186 people (15.9%).

The whole population lived in households, no one lived in non-institutionalized group quarters and no one was institutionalized.

There were 444 households, 137 (30.9%) had children under the age of 18 living in them, 294 (66.2%) were opposite-sex married couples living together, 24 (5.4%) had a female householder with no husband present, 16 (3.6%) had a male householder with no wife present.  There were 15 (3.4%) unmarried opposite-sex partnerships, and 5 (1.1%) same-sex married couples or partnerships. 84 households (18.9%) were one person and 34 (7.7%) had someone living alone who was 65 or older. The average household size was 2.64.  There were 334 families (75.2% of households); the average family size was 3.04.

The age distribution was 267 people (22.8%) under the age of 18, 71 people (6.1%) aged 18 to 24, 235 people (20.0%) aged 25 to 44, 412 people (35.1%) aged 45 to 64, and 188 people (16.0%) who were 65 or older.  The median age was 45.5 years. For every 100 females, there were 106.9 males.  For every 100 females age 18 and over, there were 102.2 males.

There were 526 housing units at an average density of 72.3 per square mile, of the occupied units 382 (86.0%) were owner-occupied and 62 (14.0%) were rented. The homeowner vacancy rate was 5.7%; the rental vacancy rate was 8.8%.  979 people (83.5% of the population) lived in owner-occupied housing units and 194 people (16.5%) lived in rental housing units.

References

Census-designated places in Riverside County, California
Census-designated places in California